The Punch Bowl is a music album by Seth Lakeman published in 2002. It is his first album as a principal performer.

Track listing
"Garden of Grace" (inspired by Kathleen Partridge) – 3:15
"Image of Love" (Seth Lakeman) – 3:11
"April Eyes" (Seth Lakeman) – 2:11
"It's All Your World" (Seth Lakeman) – 3:05
"Send Yourself Away" (inspired by Kathleen Partridge) – 2:45
"Look Outside Your Window" (Seth Lakeman) – 3:18
"How Much" (Seth Lakeman) – 2:22
"The Punch Bowl" (traditional) – 2:16
"Scrumpy's Set" (Seth Lakeman) – 2:47
"Ye Mariners All" (traditional) – 3:24

Personnel

Seth Lakeman: vocals, tenor guitar, violin, viola
Sean Lakeman: electric guitar, bass
Sam Lakeman: piano
Cara Dillon: vocals, whistle
Kathryn Roberts: vocals
Iain Goodall: drums, percussion
Ben Nicholls: upright bass
Geoff Lakeman: concertina

References

Seth Lakeman albums
2002 debut albums